Tamenglong (Meitei pronunciation:/tæmɛŋˈlɒŋ/) is a town in the Naga hills of Manipur and the district headquarter of the Tamenglong district.

Geography 

Tamenglong is located in western Manipur lying on the hilltop from which descends the Barak River. It is 160 km west of Imphal, Manipur's capital city.

Climate
Köppen-Geiger climate classification system classifies its climate as humid subtropical (Cwa). Tamenglong is a highland which makes the temperatures cooler. The warmer months are extremely rainy. July receives most rain while December is the driest.

Notes

References

External links

Tamenglong official website

Cities and towns in Tamenglong district